was a Japanese Olympic freestyle swimmer. In 1948, he set world records in the 400 and 1,500 meter freestyles at the Japan national championships.  Furuhashi and Japan were not allowed to compete at the 1948 Summer Olympics because of Japan's role in World War II.

Because of his achievement at the 1949 U.S. National Championships of Aquatics, in which he set new world records of freestyle swimming in all distance categories, Furuhashi was referred to by the US media as "the flying fish of Fujiyama".

Furuhashi competed in the 1952 Summer Olympics, but did not perform well because of the lingering effects of dysentery which he had contracted during a swimming tour of South America in 1950.  In total, Furuhashi set 33 world records during his swimming career.  After retiring from competitive swimming, he served as president of the Japanese Olympic Committee for five terms until retiring in 1999.

On August 2, 2009, he was found dead in his sleep at his hotel room in Rome, where he was staying for the 2009 World Aquatics Championships.

World records

Official 
1949 U.S. Championships
400m freestyle 4:33.3
800m freestyle 9:33.5
1500m freestyle 18:19.0

Unofficial 
1947 Japan Championships
400m freestyle 4:38.4

Honours 
Vice President - FINA
Honorary Chairman - Japan Swimming Federation
Honorary advisor - Olympians Association of Japan
Junior third rank (2009; posthumous)
Order of Culture (2008)
Order of the Rising Sun, 2nd class (2003)
Chairman - Japanese Olympic Committee (1990–99)
Vice President of Organizing Committee - 1998 Winter Olympics
Vice President of Organizing Committee - 1995 Summer Universiade
Chairman of Organizing Committee - 1994 Asian Games
Person of Cultural Merit (1993)
Secretary General - 1985 Summer Universiade
Shiju Hosho Order (1983)
International Swimming Hall of Fame (1967)

See also
 List of members of the International Swimming Hall of Fame
World record progression 400 metres freestyle
World record progression 800 metres freestyle
World record progression 1500 metres freestyle

References 

1928 births
2009 deaths
Japanese swimming coaches
People from Hamamatsu
Olympic swimmers of Japan
Swimmers at the 1952 Summer Olympics
World record setters in swimming
Japanese amputees
Academic staff of Nihon University
Nihon University alumni
Recipients of the Order of Culture
Recipients of the Order of the Rising Sun, 2nd class
Sports articles needing translation from Japanese Wikipedia
Japanese male freestyle swimmers
Recipients of the Medal with Purple Ribbon
1998 Winter Olympics
1998 Winter Paralympics
Presidents of the Japanese Olympic Committee
Presidents of the Japan Swimming Federation